Guy Forget and Jakob Hlasek were the defending champions, but lost in the quarterfinals to Eric Jelen and Carl-Uwe Steeb.

Eric Jelen and Carl-Uwe Steeb won in the final 0–6, 6–4, 7–6, against Doug Flach and Diego Nargiso.

Seeds

  Guy Forget /  Jakob Hlasek (quarterfinals)
  Jimmy Brown /  Scott Melville (first round)
  Nick Brown /  Libor Pimek (first round)
  Bret Garnett /  Jorge Lozano (semifinals)

Draw

Draw

External links
Draw

Doubles